Fussballclub Thun 1898 is a Swiss football team from the Bernese Oberland town of Thun. The club plays in the Swiss Challenge League, the second tier of the Swiss football league system, following relegation from the Swiss Super League in the 2019–20 season. The club plays at the Stockhorn Arena which accommodates a total of 10,000 supporters, both seated and standing. The club's colours are red and white.

The biggest achievements in the club's history are two second place finishes in the Swiss Cup (1955 and 2019), as well as reaching the group stages of the 2005–06 UEFA Champions League.

History

Until 1995
FC Thun was founded on 1 May 1898. The club played in the second Swiss division, the Nationalliga B (now known as Swiss Challenge League) from 1946 to 1950 and in the 1953–54 season. At the end of the 1953–54 season, the team finished in second place only behind FC Lugano and was promoted to the first division, the Nationalliga A (now known as the Swiss Super League), for the first time in the club's history. However, the club finished the 1954–55 season in second to last place and was relegated back to the second division after playing just one season in the top flight. In 1955, Thun reached the final of the Swiss Cup, which was lost 1–3 to La Chaux-de-Fonds.

From 1955 to 1970, Thun continuously played in the Nationalliga B, before being relegated to the Swiss 1. Liga, back then the third tier of the Swiss football league system, at the end of the 1969–70 season.

From third division to Champions League
In 1995, Andy Egli became the manager of Thun. Two years later, at the end of the 1996–97 season, Thun regained promotion to the Nationalliga B for the first time since 1970. Under manager Georges Bregy, the club took part in the 1999–2000 Nationalliga A/B playoff games, but could not secure promotion to the first league and remained in the Nationalliga B. From July 2001 to December 2004 the team was coached by Hanspeter Latour. Under his management, Thun was promoted to the Nationalliga A after 47 years of absence from the Swiss top flight at the end of the 2001–02 season. After Latour left Thun to coach Grasshopper Club Zürich, Urs Schönenberger was appointed as the new head coach.

Thun finished the 2004–05 season in second place only behind FC Basel and thus became runners-up of the Swiss championship, which was rebranded from Nationalliga A to Swiss Super League by then. This constituted the best league result in the history of the club and also secured the club a place in the qualifying rounds for the Champions League. By beating Dynamo Kyiv (3–2 on aggregate) and Malmö FF (4–0 on aggregate) in the qualifying rounds, FC Thun reached the group stages of the 2005–06 Champions League. They were drawn in Group B alongside European giants Arsenal, Ajax and Sparta Prague. They started their campaign on 14 September 2005 away at Arsenal, where after equalising through Nelson Ferreira, they narrowly lost 2–1 after Dennis Bergkamp scored in the match's final seconds. On 27 September they hosted the Czech champions Sparta Prague at home, the Stadion Wankdorf in Bern, where all the club's European home matches were held, as the Lachen Stadium does not meet Uefa's prerequisites for Champions League venues. Thun's 1–0 victory thanks to Selver Hodžić's 80th-minute winner propelled them into second place in the group. Following a loss to Ajax on 2 November, they lost 1–0 at home to Arsenal and with Ajax beating Sparta Prague, FC Thun exited the Champions League. However, Thun drew 0–0 with Sparta Prague in their last group match, securing third place in the group and thus qualifying for the UEFA Cup Round of 32.

Despite his success, coach Urs Schönenberger was regarded as a controversial figure by the club management because of his uncompromising nature and communication style. Just three days prior to their Uefa Cup tie against Hamburger SV, on 13 February 2006, Thun sacked Schönenberger, who had guided them to the Champions' League group stages and replaced him with Heinz Peischl. In the first leg, Thun managed a surprise 1–0 over Hamburg at the Stade de Suisse. However, Hamburg was too strong at their home, the Volksparkstadion, and managed to overturn the deficit, winning the second leg 2–0 (2–1 on aggregate).

Between first and second division
FC Thun finished the 2007–08 season in last place and was subsequently relegated to the second division. Two years later, the club managed to win the 2009–10 Swiss Challenge League and was promoted back to the Super League under head coach Murat Yakin. Yakin led the team to a fifth-place finish in the following season but left Thun to assume the role as head coach of FC Luzern before the start of the 2011–12 season. Under the new coach Bernard Challandes, the team played in the qualifying rounds of the 2011–12 Europa League. After winning against Albanian side KF Vllaznia Shkodër (2–1 on aggregate) and advancing against Italian club US Palermo because of the away goals rule (3–3 on aggregate), Thun lost 1–5 on aggregate to Stoke City in the final play-off round and thus missed qualification for the group stages.

Urs Fischer took over management of the team in January 2013 and lead FC Thun to a fifth place finish in the 2012–13 season. In the qualifying rounds of the 2013–14 Europa League, Thun managed to win against Georgian team Chikhura Sachkhere (5–1 on aggregate), Swedish side BK Häcken (3–1 on aggregate) as well as FK Partizan from Serbia (3–1 on aggregate) and thus qualified for the group stages of the competition. They were drawn in Group G against Rapid Wien, KRC Genk and Dynamo Kyiv. In their group, the team won only one out of the six fixtures (1–0 against Rapid Wien) and lost the other five games, finishing last in the group and dropping out of the competition.

In 2019, FC Thun reached the final of the Swiss Cup for the second time in the club's history. They lost the game 1–2 against FC Basel.

In November 2019, PMG, Chien Lee and The Seelig Group invested in the club and became the co-owners of FC Thun football club.

Thun finished the 2019–20 season in second to last place and had to face the runners-up team of the 2019–20 Challenge League, FC Vaduz, in the relegation play-offs. After losing 0–2 in the first leg played away in Rheinpark Stadion, the 4–3 victory in the second leg was not enough to win on aggregate, which meant that FC Thun was relegated to the Swiss Challenge League. In the following season, the club reached second place in the Challenge League and qualified for the promotion play-offs, but lost 4–6 on aggregate against FC Sion and remained in the second division.

Current squad

On loan

European record
 Q= Qualifying
 PO = Play-off

Former coaches

 Hans Luder (1946–48)
  Hans Pulver (1948–49)
  Jimmy Townley (1949–50)
 Hans Luder (1953–54)
 Hans Luder/ Hermann Czischek (1954–56)
  Hermann Czischek (1956–58)
  Alfred "Coppi" Beck (1958–62)
 Hermann Jucker (1962–63)
  Matthias Rossbach (1963–67)
  Heinz Schneiter (1967–69)
  Lothar Weise (1969–70)
  Miroslav Patak (1971–72)
 Fridolin Hofer (1972–73)
  René Raboud (1973–74)
  Hanspeter Latour (1978–83)
 Otto Messerli (1984–86)
  Martin Trümpler (1986–90)
 Willi Kaufmann (1990–92)

 Peter Mast (1992–93)
  Stefan Marini (1994–95)
  Andy Egli (1 July 1995 – 31 December 1998)
  Georges Bregy (1 Jan 1999 – 30 June 2001)
  Hanspeter Latour (1 July 2001 – 31 December 2004)
  Urs Schönenberger (1 Jan 2005 – 13 February 2006)
  Adrian Kunz (interim) (13 Feb 2006 – 15 February 2006)
  Heinz Peischl (14 Feb 2006 – 6 March 2007)
  Jeff Saibene (6 March 2007 – 5 June 2007)
  René van Eck (1 July 2007 – 30 June 2008)
  Hansruedi Baumann (1 July 2008 – 12 May 2009)
  Eric-Pi Zuercher (2009)
  Andres Gerber (interim) (12 May 2009 – 30 June 2009)
  Murat Yakin (1 July 2009 – 30 June 2011)
  Bernard Challandes (1 July 2011 – 20 November 2012)
  Mauro Lustrinelli (interim) (21 Nov 2012 – 31 December 2012)
  Urs Fischer (1 Jan 2013– June 2015)
  Ciriaco Sforza (26 July 2015 – 30 September 2015)
  Jeff Saibene (1 October 2015 –19 March 2017)

Honours
Swiss Challenge League/Nationalliga B
 Champions: 2009–10
 Promoted: 1953–54, 2001–02

Swiss Cup
 Runners-up: 1954–55, 2018–19

References

External links

 
 FC Thun at UEFA.com

 
Football clubs in Switzerland
Thun
Association football clubs established in 1898
1898 establishments in Switzerland